Makis Katsavakis (born 26 December 1953) is a Greek professional football manager and former player.

Career
Born in Peponia, Serres, Katsavakis began playing football as a defender for local Alpha Ethniki side Panserraikos F.C. He joined Alpha Ethniki rivals Olympiacos F.C. in 1977. He finished his career with Korinthos F.C. in 1982.

After he retired from playing, Katsavakis became a football coach. He was appointed manager by Edessaikos F.C. in 1992. He managed several Greek clubs over the following years, including Veria F.C., PAS Giannina F.C., Panionios F.C., Paniliakos F.C., Olympiakos Volos F.C., Panserraikos F.C., Aris Thessaloniki F.C., Levadiakos F.C., Apollon Kalamarias F.C., Iraklis Thessaloniki F.C. and Doxa Drama. He also managed Cypriot side AEK Larnaca.

References

External links
 
 Profile at Onsports.gr

1953 births
Living people
People from Serres (regional unit)
Greek footballers
Footballers from Central Macedonia
Association football defenders
Panserraikos F.C. players
Olympiacos F.C. players
Korinthos F.C. players
Greek football managers
Panionios F.C. managers
Pierikos F.C. managers
Iraklis Thessaloniki F.C. managers
Aris Thessaloniki F.C. managers
Panserraikos F.C. managers
PAS Giannina F.C. managers
Niki Volos F.C. managers
Olympiacos Volos F.C. managers
Greek expatriate football managers
Greek expatriate sportspeople in Cyprus
Expatriate football managers in Cyprus